The 33rd British Academy Film Awards, given by the British Academy of Film and Television Arts in 1980, honoured the best films of 1979.

Winners and nominees

 BAFTA Fellowship: John Huston
 BAFTA Outstanding British Contribution to Cinema Award: Children's Film Foundation

Statistics

See also
 52nd Academy Awards
 5th César Awards
 32nd Directors Guild of America Awards
 37th Golden Globe Awards
 6th Saturn Awards
 32nd Writers Guild of America Awards

References

External links
 Official Website

Film033
1979 film awards
1980 in British cinema
1979 awards in the United Kingdom